Suttontown is an unincorporated community in Sampson County, North Carolina, United States.

The Marshall Kornegay House and Cemetery was added to the National Register of Historic Places in 1986.

References

Unincorporated communities in Sampson County, North Carolina
Unincorporated communities in North Carolina